Leo Green (born 30 August 1972) is a British musician and broadcaster.

Saxophonist and orchestra leader 
Green played with Van Morrison's band. Green plays saxophone and sings in his own band. In 2010 guitarist Jeff Beck said, "Leo Green has to be one of the best and craziest saxophonists ever". 

The Leo Green Orchestra accompanied Tom Chaplin (from Keane), Beverley Knight and Imelda May for concerts that were broadcast on BBC Radio 2.

Broadcaster
Green has presented programmes on BBC radio, including:
2013 – Leo Green's Hollywood Special
2014 – It Was a Very Good Year – The Ervin Drake Story
2014 – Ella and the Songbooks
2014 – Too Late to Stop Now – The Van Morrison Story
2015–16 - Sounds of the 50s with Leo Green.
2016 – Leo Green Remembers...
2016 – Leo Green Talks....Jazz
2017 – Leo Green's Great American Songbook
2017 – Leo Green's Lovers Of Swing
2018–19 - The Green Room

Green has hosted several editions of BBC Radio 2's Friday Night Is Music Night.

Discography

As leader
 Suited and Booted (2006)
 Sax Moods – The Way We Were (2002)
 Straight Up (1998)

As sideman
With Jeff Beck
 Crazy Legs (1993)

With Van Morrison
 Days Like This (1995)
 How Long Has This Been Going On (1996) (with Georgie Fame and friends)
 Tell Me Something: The Songs of Mose Allison (1996) (with Georgie Fame, Ben Sidran, and Mose Allison)
 The Healing Game (1997)
 Back on Top [Bonus Tracks] (originally released 1999)

With Lisa Stansfield
 Swing (1999)

With Jane Horrocks
 Further Adventures of Little Voice Jane Horrocks (2000)

With Jools Holland
 Small World Big Band (2001)
 Swing Album (2001)
 Jools Holland's Big Band (2002)
 More Friends: Small World Big Band, Vol. 2 (2002)
 Swinging the Blues Dancing the Ska (2005)

Daniel Bedingfield
 Gotta Get Thru This (2002)

With Beth Gibbons & Rustin Man
 Out of Season (2002)

With Various
 Songs of Jimmie Rodgers: A Tribute (1997)
 A Tribute to Bacharach & David (2001)
 A Tribute to Leiber & Stoller (2002)
 Let Me Be Your Side Track: The Influence of Jimmy Rogers (2008)

References

External links
 Official Musician site
 Official Radio site

Van Morrison
Living people
English rock saxophonists
British male saxophonists
BBC Radio 2 presenters
1972 births
Place of birth missing (living people)
21st-century saxophonists